Muhammad Mustafizur Rahman (Jan 1, 1941 – Jan 14, 2014) was a Bangladeshi Islamic scholar, academician and Quran translator. He served as the 7th vice chancellor of Islamic University, Bangladesh from December 10, 2001, to April 2, 2004. He also served as a professor at the University of Dhaka. The first Bangladeshi scholar to translate the Qur'an into English, Rahman wrote many books and scholarly articles on Islam.

Early life and education 
Mustafizur Rahman was born in 1941 in the Surjomoni village of Pirojpur district in the then East Pakistan (now Bangladesh). His father's name is Muhammad Abdul Majid Munshi and his mother's name is Lal Boru Begum. He studied Arabic literature at the University of Dhaka.

Career 
Rahman began his academic career as a lecturer at Arabic department of the University of Dhaka. Later, he became a full professor and served as its Chair. On December 10, 2001, Rahman was appointed as Vice-chancellor of the Islamic University, Bangladesh. He could not, however, complete his term and eventually left the university on April 2, 2004.

Death 
Suffering from old age complicacies, Mustafizur Rahman died on January 14, 2014, at United Hospital in Dhaka.

Bibliography 
Rahman wrote many books and scholarly articles on Islam. He is noted as the first Bangladeshi scholar to translate the Quran into English. His books include:

In Bnagla

 Complete Bengali Translation of the Holy Quran (Benglai: কোরআন শরিফ পূর্ণাঙ্গ বঙ্গানুবাদ), ( ISBN Number: 9844380278)  The Holy Quran with Arabic-Bengali Pronunciation, Meaning and Shane Nuzul. ( Bengali: আরবী বাংলা উচ্চারণ অর্থ ও শানে নুযুলসহ কোরআন শরীফ), ISBN Number: 98443806010 The Message of the Qur'an (Bengali: কোরআনের বাণী) Introduction to the Quran (Bengali: কুরআন পরিচিতি) Al-Munir Arabic-Bengali DictionaryIn English

 Quran Majeed with Arabic Text and English Translation The Holy Quran with Bengali and English Pronunciation ISBN Number: 9844381204''

References 

1941 births
2014 deaths
Bangladeshi male writers
University of Dhaka alumni
Vice-Chancellors of the Islamic University, Bangladesh
Translators of the Quran into English
People from Pirojpur District
20th-century translators
Academic staff of the University of Dhaka
Bengali Muslim scholars of Islam
Bangladeshi Sunni Muslim scholars of Islam